Vangelis Anastasopoulos (born 7 March 1994) is a Greek professional footballer who plays as a defensive midfielder for Super League 2 club Anagennisi Karditsa.

Honours
Panathinaikos
Greek Cup: 2013–14

Sparta
Gamma Ethniki: 2015–16

Ierapetra
Gamma Ethniki: 2018–19

References

1994 births
Living people
Greek footballers
Greece youth international footballers
Super League Greece players
Super League Greece 2 players
Football League (Greece) players
Gamma Ethniki players
Panathinaikos F.C. players
Niki Volos F.C. players
PAS Lamia 1964 players
A.E. Sparta P.A.E. players
Trikala F.C. players
Panserraikos F.C. players
O.F. Ierapetra F.C. players
AO Chania F.C. players
Asteras Vlachioti F.C. players
Anagennisi Karditsa F.C. players
Association football midfielders
Footballers from Pyrgos, Elis